Liceo Cervantes may refer to:
 Liceo Español Cervantes in Rome, Italy
 Liceo Miguel de Cervantes y Saavedra, in Santiago de Chile